Harry Bush (born November 6, 1989) is an American first-class cricketer who played for Leeds/Bradford MCCU. He made his first-class debut for Leeds/Bradford MCCU against Surrey in March 2012.

References

External links
 
 

1989 births
Living people
American cricketers
Norfolk cricketers
Leeds/Bradford MCCU cricketers
Alumni of the University of Leeds
Cricketers from Los Angeles